

The Vordersee (also named Märjelen-Stausee) is a reservoir located east of the Aletsch Glacier, between the Strahlhorn and the Eggishorn, in the Swiss canton of Valais. The lake has a surface area of 0.062 km² and is located at 2,360 metres above sea level. It is located in the municipality of Fieschertal.

See also
List of mountain lakes of Switzerland

References

Lakes of Valais
Lakes of Switzerland